Mathias Unkuri (born 16 January 1988) is a Swedish footballer.

He has played in Norway with Nybergsund and Denmark with Hobro IK.

References

External links 

1988 births
Living people
Swedish footballers
Sweden under-21 international footballers
Helsingborgs IF players
Ängelholms FF players
Landskrona BoIS players
Hobro IK players
Nybergsund IL players
Swedish expatriate footballers
Expatriate men's footballers in Denmark
Expatriate footballers in Norway
Swedish expatriate sportspeople in Denmark
Swedish expatriate sportspeople in Norway
Association football midfielders